DJ-Kicks: Brandt Brauer Frick is a DJ mix album by German electronic musician Brandt Brauer Frick. It was released on 25 February 2014 under Studio !K7 independent record label as part of their DJ-Kicks series.

Track list
 Jan Jelinek - HipBird 
 Inkswel - Australaborialis
 Theo Parrish - Electric Alleycat 
 Dollkraut - Rollercoaster 
 William Onyeabor - Better Change Your Mind 
 Max Graef - Bummse 
 Brandt Brauer Frick - Bommel 
 Kingdom - Stalker Ha 
 Parental Control - Feel Like / Le K - Abraz 
 Alfabet (Awanto 3 & Tom Trago) - Lap The Music 
 Fantastic Man - Late At Night 
 Brandt Brauer Frick - Out Of Tash 
 Galaxy 2 Galaxy feat. Atlantis - Transition 
 Peverelist - Sun Dance 
 DJ Do Bass - To Catchy 
 French Fries - White Screen 
 Chico Mann - Soul Freedom 
 James Braun & Troels Abrahamsen - Wooden Knuckles 
 Glenn Astro - How I Miss You 
 Philogresz - Edge 
 Bok Bok & Tom Trago - Vector 
 Cosmin TRG - Echolab Disaster 
 MMM - Re-tics 
 Jam City - How We Relate To The Body 
 Brandt Brauer Frick - Hugo (DJ-Kicks) 
 Machinedrum - Now U Know Tha Deal 4 Real 
 Thundercat - Tenfold 
 Dean Blunt - Galice

References

2014 compilation albums
Albums produced by Jam City
DJ-Kicks albums